Phenylmercuric nitrate is an organomercury compound with powerful antiseptic and antifungal effects. It was once commonly used as a topical solution for disinfecting wounds, but as with all organomercury compounds it is highly toxic, especially to the kidneys, and is no longer used in this application. However it is still used in low concentrations as a preservative in eye drops for ophthalmic use, making it one of the few organomercury derivatives remaining in current medical use.

See also
 Merbromin
 Phenylmercury acetate
 Phenylmercuric borate
 Thiomersal

References

Antiseptics
Organomercury compounds